1-(Diphenylmethyl)piperazine, also known as benzhydrylpiperazine, is a chemical compound and piperazine derivative. It features a piperazine ring with a benzhydryl (diphenylmethyl) group bound to one of the nitrogens.

References

Piperazines
Diphenylmethylpiperazines
Benzhydryl compounds